Angiopoietin-4 is a protein that in humans is encoded by the ANGPT4 gene.

Angiopoietins are proteins with important roles in vascular development and angiogenesis. 
All angiopoietins bind with similar affinity to an endothelial cell-specific tyrosine-protein kinase receptor. 
The mechanism by which they contribute to angiogenesis is thought to involve regulation of endothelial cell interactions with supporting perivascular cells. 

The protein encoded by this gene functions as an agonist and is an angiopoietin.

References

External links

Further reading